"Tessaracoccus timonensis" is a Gram-negative and non-motile bacterium from the genus Tessaracoccus which has been isolated from  vaginal swabs from Senegalese women.

References 

Propionibacteriales
Bacteria described in 2019